The Obsidian Chronicles are a trilogy by Lawrence Watt-Evans. The three books are Dragon Weather, The Dragon Society, and Dragon Venom.

It centers around a boy named Arlian and his quest for vengeance against the dragons that destroyed his hometown and killed his family, and against the man who sold him into slavery, the mysterious and ruthless Lord Dragon. Along the way, Arlian will uncover the secret behind draconic reproduction, and even how to make a god. Eventually, coming face to face with the specific dragon who killed Arlian's beloved grandfather, Arlian discovers that even the dragons are not wantonly evil and that in fact their lot is rather tragic. 

As openly stated by the author, the series borrows many basic plot elements from Alexandre Dumas' classic Count of Monte Christo: a young man is deeply wronged and consigned to a completely unmerited, harsh imprisonment; he befriends an older fellow prisoner, through whom he gains potential access to great treasure - but only if he could escape; the older prisoner dies, and the young protagonist does manage to escape, against all odds; he gains the treasure and uses it to establish for himself a position of great power and wealth; he embarks on a campaign of systematic revenge against all who had wronged him, but revenge gives less than a perfect satisfaction - when finally brought down, many of those who wronged him seem less than completely evil. These Monte Christo elements are, however, placed in a fantasy framework (especially, the prominent role played by the dragons) and all the details of the wrong done to the protagonist and the revenge he takes are completely different from Dumas' book. 

Fantasy novel trilogies
Books about dragons